Oleksiy Oleksandrovych Hutsulyak (born 25 December 1997) is a Ukrainian professional footballer who plays as a left midfielder for Dnipro-1.

Career
Hutsulyak is the product of the UFK Lviv School System. His first trainers were Taras Pavlish and Andriy Dulibskyi.

FC Karpaty
He made his debut for Karpaty Lviv against FC Metalurh Donetsk on 1 March 2015 in Ukrainian Premier League.

FC Desna Chernihiv
In 2020 he signed for with Desna Chernihiv in the Ukrainian Premier League, becoming the most expensive player bought by the club of Chernihiv. He helped them qualify for the quarterfinals of the 2019-20 Ukrainian Cup.

He was included in the match day lineup for Desna Chernihiv against VfL Wolfsburg in the 2020–21 Europa League third qualifying round at the AOK Stadion and made his first European competitive appearance as a second-half substitute. On 8 March 2021 he scored his first league goal for Desna Chernihiv against Rukh Lviv in a 4–0 away victory. On 10 April he scored his second league goal against Oleksandriya in a 4–1 victory.

Dnipro-1
On 15 August 2021, he transferred to Dnipro-1 on a four-year contract for €500,000,

International career
Hutsulyak has represented Ukraine at every level from under-16 to under-21. In April 2022 he received his first call-up to the Ukraine national team but did not appear.

Honours

Individual
 Ukrainian Premier League Player of the Round: 2020–21 Round 5

Career statistics

Club

References

External links
 
 
 
 

1997 births
Living people
People from Krasyliv
Association football forwards
Ukrainian footballers
Ukraine youth international footballers
Ukraine under-21 international footballers
FC Karpaty Lviv players
Villarreal CF C players
FC Desna Chernihiv players
SC Dnipro-1 players
Ukrainian Premier League players
Tercera División players
Ukrainian expatriate footballers
Expatriate footballers in Spain
Ukrainian expatriate sportspeople in Spain
Sportspeople from Khmelnytskyi Oblast